Wierzchomino  (formerly German Varchmin) is a village in the administrative district of Gmina Będzino, within Koszalin County, West Pomeranian Voivodeship, in north-western Poland.

References

Wierzchomino